The Spies, also known as The Spy, is a 2012 South Korean action comedy film, starring Kim Myung-min, Yum Jung-ah, Byun Hee-bong, Jung Gyu-woon, Yoo Hae-jin and directed by Woo Min-ho. It is about North Korean undercover spies living mundane lives in South Korea. The film was released on September 20, 2012, and attracted 1,310,895 admissions nationwide.

Plot
Section chief Kim (Kim Myung-min) was dispatched to South Korea 22 years ago to spy for the North Korean government. But spying is not his job anymore, or at least, it’s not what he does in daily life. Now, Kim makes a living by selling fake Viagra pills smuggled from China and returns home every night to his wife and two loving children.

When Kim unexpectedly receives an assassination order from his boss (Yoo Hae-jin), he gathers his teammates which consist of assistant manager Kang (Yum Jung-ah), a single mother and real estate agent, adviser Yoon (Byun Hee-bong), a retired senior citizen who specializes in making forged IDs, and assistant manager Woo (Jung Gyu-woon), a farmer whose expertise lies on hacking computers. Although these four people no longer want to be part of the assassination coup, they have no choice but to follow the order.

While performing a reconnaissance routine, Kim enters the residence of their target as a cable repairman and notices a large safe in one of the rooms. Later, he meets his fellow spies and devises a secondary plan to steal the safe’s money. No one knows if they will actually be able to get hold of the money as they in turn have become the target of the South Korean government.

Cast
Kim Myung-min – Section chief Kim 
Yum Jung-ah – Assistant manager Kang 
Byun Hee-bong – Adviser Yoon 
Jung Gyu-woon – Assistant manager Woo
Yoo Hae-jin – Department head Choi
Jung Man-sik – NIS section chief
Chun Bo-geun – Kim's son
Oh Na-ra
Kim Jin-hee
Oh Kwang-rok – man on bench (cameo)

References

External links 
  
 
 
 

2012 films
2012 action comedy films
2010s spy comedy films
South Korean spy comedy films
South Korean action comedy films
South Korean heist films
Films set in Seoul
Films shot in Seoul
Lotte Entertainment films
2010s Korean-language films
Films directed by Woo Min-ho
2012 comedy films
Films about North Korea–South Korea relations
2010s South Korean films